Cryomyces minteri is a fungus of uncertain placement in the class Dothideomycetes, division Ascomycota. The rock-inhabiting fungus that was discovered in the McMurdo Dry Valleys located in Antarctica, on fragments of rock colonized by a local cryptoendolithic community.

In 2008, Cryomyces minteri and Cryomyces antarcticus were simultaneously tested in low earth orbit conditions on the EXPOSE-E facility on the EuTEF (European Technology Exposure Facility) platform outside the International Space Station for 18 months.

It was also tested in a space vacuum along with polychromatic UV radiation to simulate a Martian environment. The two fungi survived both of the simulations.

References

External links 
 Catalogue of Life: Dothideomycetes

Dothideomycetes enigmatic taxa
Fungi described in 2005
Fungi of Antarctica